The Australian Art Association was founded in Melbourne, Victoria, in 1912 by Edward Officer (inaugural president) John Mather, Frederick McCubbin, Max Meldrum and Walter Withers.

Members included Norman Macgeorge (second president), Rupert Bunny, William Dunn Knox, James Ranalph Jackson, and Leslie Wilkie.

William Dunn Knox's first exhibition was in 1918 at the Australian Art Association, Melbourne. He was elected to the Australian Art Association in 1919 and was later on the council, and serving as its Treasurer in 1924 with Mrs. George Bell, Louis McCubbin, Norman Macgeorge, Alexander Colquhoun, Napier Waller, Charles Wheeler, Harry (Henry Broomilow) Harrison, and Charles Web Gilbert, under President W. B. McInnes, with Leslie Wilkie secretary.

Bibliography 
Joyce McGrath, The Australian Art Association, 1912-1933 (B. Soc. Sci. special study, Royal Melbourne Institute of Technology, 1974)

References

1912 establishments in Australia
Arts organisations based in Australia
Australian artist groups and collectives
Arts organizations established in 1912